The men's team competition in table tennis at the 2019 European Games in Minsk is the second edition of the event in a European Games. It was held at Tennis Olympic Centre from 27 June to 29 June 2019.

Schedule
All times are FET (UTC+03:00)

Seeds
The seeding lists were announced on 8 June 2019.

Result

First round

Quarterfinals

Semifinals

Bronze medal match

Gold medal match

References

External links
Results

Men's team